Erika Janeth Hernández Díaz (born 17 March 1999) is a Panamanian footballer who plays as a forward for Argentine club UAI Urquiza and the Panama women's national team.

International career
Hernández appeared in five matches for Panama and scored one goal at the 2018 CONCACAF Women's Championship.

International goals

See also
 List of Panama women's international footballers

References

External links

1999 births
Living people
Sportspeople from Panama City
Panamanian women's footballers
Women's association football forwards
UAI Urquiza (women) players
Panama women's international footballers
Pan American Games competitors for Panama
Footballers at the 2019 Pan American Games
Panamanian expatriate women's footballers
Panamanian expatriate sportspeople in Argentina
Expatriate women's footballers in Argentina